Paredes de Coura e Resende is a civil parish in the municipality of Paredes de Coura, Portugal. It was formed in 2013 by the merger of the former parishes Paredes de Coura and Resende. The population in 2011 was 2,099, in an area of 5.84 km².

Sites of interests 

 The old prison of Paredes de Coura
 The pelourinho of Paredes de Coura

References

Freguesias of Paredes de Coura